Samuel Louis Gursky (born October 9, 1991) is a Brooklyn, NY-based filmmaker and graduate of the School of Visual Arts, He is the director of Brooklyn Rocksteady.

Brooklyn Rocksteady
Brooklyn Rocksteady is a documentary exploring the Ska/Rocksteady scene of New York City between the years of 1981–2011, featuring exclusive interviews and live footage from members of many notable acts such as The Slackers, The Toasters, The Forthrights and more.

The project was funded partially by crowd-sourced funding using the website kickstarter.

References

External links
 

1991 births
Living people
American filmmakers
American music video directors
People from Woodbury, Nassau County, New York